Raymond Daniel Goolsby (September 5, 1919 – November 13, 1999) was an American professional baseball player. His career, interrupted by World War II, lasted for only four seasons, but included three games played in Major League Baseball for the  Washington Senators.

Goolsby was born in Florala, Alabama, and his family moved  to Central Florida in 1925 when he turned six. He entered pro ball in 1939 and played three seasons in the Florida State League, then a Class D circuit at the lowest level of Organized Baseball. In 1942, he joined the U.S. military; his obituary states that he served in the United States Navy, but, according to Baseball in Wartime, he served in the United States Army. 

In 1946, the first postwar season, MLB rosters were temporarily expanded to accommodate returning military veterans resuming their baseball careers; teams carried 36 players until June 15. Goolsby broke spring training camp with Washington and appeared in three mid-April games: on the 18th and 19th as a pinch hitter, and on the 22nd as the Senators' starting left fielder. In those three contests, he had four at bats without a hit, with one walk and one sacrifice. He then played the rest of the year at Double-A Chattanooga, hitting .306 in 99 games.

Goolsby, then 27, left baseball after the 1946 season. He worked in the citrus industry, rising to manager. He died in Apopka, Florida, at the age of 80. His wife was Lucy R. Goolsby (October 4, 1917 – October 20, 2015), whom he married  in Apopka. He and his wife are buried in Highland Memory Gardens in Forest City, Florida.

References

External links

1919 births
1999 deaths
Baseball players from Alabama
Chattanooga Lookouts players
Leesburg Anglers players
Major League Baseball left fielders
People from Apopka, Florida
People from Florala, Alabama
St. Augustine Saints players
American military personnel of World War II
Washington Senators (1901–1960) players